László Szilágyi (born August 29, 1965) is a Hungarian teacher and politician who served as a member of the National Assembly (MP) from the Politics Can Be Different (LMP) National List from 2010 to 2014.

Political career
Szilágyi was a member of the LMP party between 2009 and 2013. He was elected to the National Assembly from the party's National List during the 2010 Hungarian parliamentary election. He became a member of the Committee on Health May 14, 2010.

In January 2013, the LMP congress rejected the electoral cooperation with other opposition forces, including Together 2014. As a result, members of LMP’s “Dialogue for Hungary” platform, including Szilágyi, announced their decision to leave the opposition party and create a new formation, Dialogue for Hungary. LMP member Benedek Jávor stated that the eight MPs leaving the party would keep their parliamentary mandates.

References

1965 births
Living people
Eötvös Loránd University alumni
LMP – Hungary's Green Party politicians
Dialogue for Hungary politicians
Members of the National Assembly of Hungary (2010–2014)
People from Nyíregyháza